The 1999 WNBA season was the 3rd for the Cleveland Rockers. The Rockers played their worst season in franchise history, finishing dead last in the league.

Offseason

WNBA Draft

Regular season

Season standings

Season schedule

Player stats

References

External links
Rockers on Basketball Reference

Cleveland Rockers seasons
Cleveland
Cleveland Rockers